Josephine Siao Fong-fong  is a Hong Kong film star who became popular as a child actress and continued her success as a mature actress, winning numerous awards including Best Actress at the 45th Berlin International Film Festival (for Summer Snow). Since retiring from show business (partly due to her increasing deafness), she has become a writer and a psychologist, known for her work against child abuse.

Biography

Siao was born as Siao Liang in Shanghai, with her ancestral home in Luzhi, Suzhou, Jiangsu. At the age of two, she was brought to Hong Kong by her parents.

Soon after her father died, at the age of six (1953), she began to become a child star to solve the family's financial problems.  When she was 7 years old, she took on the first film and art film "Little Star Tears" (1954). In 1956, she performed "Aunt Mei" for the Shaw Brothers Company. Her famous work is "The Wandering Children" (1960) and this made her became one of the biggest teen idols in Hong Kong during the late 1960s, along with frequent co-star Connie Chan Po-chu. The two were often cast in wuxia films as disciples of the same master and sometimes—when Connie played the male lead—as young heroes in love. Back in the 1960s, Josephine's and Connie's fans maintained a heated rivalry. News of their fans getting into catfights was not uncommon in those days.

Unlike many child stars, Siao made a successful transition to adult stardom, remaining one of Hong Kong's most prolific and popular actresses.  She was also one of the directors (co-directing with Leung Po-Chih 梁普智) and writers of Jumping Ash (跳灰). This film is regarded as a prelude to the Hong Kong New Wave in the 1980s by film critics.

Having largely missed out on formal education because of her acting career as a child, Siao pursued her studies in later years despite the handicap of increasing deafness and the demands of raising a family (she has two daughters by her second husband).  During this time she made fewer films, but her output included highly praised work such as her award-winning performance in Summer Snow (1995) as a middle-aged widow trying to cope with her father-in-law suffering from Alzheimer's Disease.

Western fans of martial arts films will probably know her best from the Fong Sai-yuk films made in 1993, in which she played Jet Li's kung fu–fighting mother. (These films were released on Western DVD as The Legend and The Legend II.)

Siao has been retired from show business since 1997 in favour of her work in child psychology.  In particular, she is a noted campaigner against child abuse, and founded the End Child Sexual Abuse Foundation, which she now chairs, in 1999.  She is also a published author.

Some of the milestones in her life include:

 1970: Bachelor's degree in Mass Communications and Asian Studies at Seton Hall University
 1974: won the best actress award at Spain Film Festival and Taiwan Film Festival
 1990: obtained a master's degree in child psychology from Regis University
 1995: won the best actress award at the Berlin Film Festival for Summer Snow
 1996: member of the Most Excellent Order of the British Empire
 2009: Life Achievement Award of the 28th Hong Kong Film Awards

Filmography

Films 
This is a partial list of films.
 1954 Tears of a Young Concubine - Hsiao-Yu.
 1955 An Orphan's Tragedy
 1967 A Sweet Girl 
 1967 Blood Stains The Iron Fist - Ting Wai-Kuen.
 1967 The Blue Bees 
 1967 Diamond Robbery 
 1967 The Flying Red Rose 
 1967 The Golden Cat - Golden Cat.
 1967 Happy Years - Mei-Yuk/Yuk.
 1967 The Horrifying Adventure of a Girl 
 1967 How the Sacred Fire Heroic Winds Defeat the Fire Lotus Array - To Kuen-Yee.
 1967 I Love A-Go-Go - So So.
 1967 Lady in Pink - Kwok Siu-lan. 
 1967 The Lady Killer - Wong Fuk-Mui.
 1967 Lau Kam Ding - the Female General 
 1967 Lightning Killer - Fong Ching-Wah.
 1967 Maiden Thief 
 1967 The Professionals - Kam Ngau, Gold Bull.
 1967 Rocambole - Ching Yuk-Chu.
 1967 Romance of a Teenage Girl - Kit-Fong.
 1967 Seven Princesses (Part 1) - Luk Sau-King.
 1967 Seven Princesses (Part 2) - Luk Sau-King.
 1967 Shaky Steps - Lui Suk-Chong.
 1967 The Three Swordsmen 
 1967 You Are the One I Love - Law Oi-Lin.
 1974 Rhythm of the Wave   海韻
 1976 Jumping Ash (1976) 跳灰
 1978 Lam Ah Chun  林亞珍
 1980 The Spooky Bunch  撞到正 
 1982 Plain Jane to the Rescue  八彩林亞珍
 1982 The Perfect Match 佳人有約
 1984 A Friend from Inner Space 奸人鬼
 1987 The Wrong Couples  不是冤家不聚頭 
 1991 Fist of Fury 1991   新精武門1991
 1992 Fist of Fury 1991 II   漫畫威龍
 1992 Too Happy for Words   兩個女人，一個靚，一個唔靚兩個女人
 1993 Fong Sai Yuk   方世玉  
 1993 Fong Sai-yuk II   方世玉續集 
 1993 Always on My Mind  搶錢夫妻 
 1993 Kin Chan No Cinema Jack  陳健沒有傑克電影院
 1995 Summer Snow 女人四十 
 1996 Hu-Du-Men 虎度門 
 1996 Mahjong Dragon  麻雀飛龍

Sources:

Books 
 洋相 : 英美社交禮儀. .

Legacy 
The Siao Fong-fong Performing Art Hall was established in 1998 at Shantang Street of Luzhi township in the Siao family's former residence.

References

External links
 
 Josephine Siao Fong-Fong at hkmdb.com
 Josephine Siao at senscritique.com
 Siao Fong Fong movies at cinemasie.com
 End Child Sexual Abuse Foundation (founded and chaired by Siao)

 

 

1947 births
20th-century Hong Kong actresses
Actresses from Shanghai
Cantopop singers
Child psychologists
Chinese Civil War refugees
20th-century Hong Kong women singers
Hong Kong film actresses
Hong Kong people with disabilities
Hong Kong women psychologists
Hong Kong television actresses
Hong Kong women writers
Living people
Members of the Order of the British Empire
Regis University alumni
Seton Hall University alumni
Silver Bear for Best Actress winners
Hong Kong idols
Scientists with disabilities